The Sky Moves Sideways is the third studio album by British progressive rock band Porcupine Tree, first released in January 1995.

Background
The Sky Moves Sideways has been compared to Pink Floyd's Wish You Were Here because of their similar structure; since both albums have extended pieces at the beginning and end, which are the halves of a single song.

The track "Moonloop" is an edited and overdubbed version of a 40-minute improvisation by the full live band recorded at the Doghouse studio on 28 June 1994; a section unused on the album featured a drum beat that would go on to form the basis of "Stars Die." The full length version was released as Transmission IV in 2001.

The Sky Moves Sideways was the first Porcupine Tree album to be released in the US (albeit with an altered track list), and the first on which Porcupine Tree was actually a band rather than simply a pseudonym for Steven Wilson. This transition took place while the album was being recorded, so two of the tracks – namely "The Moon Touches Your Shoulder" and "Dislocated Day" – are performed entirely by Wilson, while the full band appears on the remainder of the album (including "Stars Die", a UK single which was added to the US version of the album). In 2004, a new, two CD version of the album was released, featuring newly recorded drums by Gavin Harrison on these two tracks.

There are thus three distinct versions of this album – the original UK version, the US version, and the 2004 remaster – no two of which feature the same track list, or the same version of "Moonloop".

Wilson remixed elements of "The Colour of Air" for use in the track "Fuse the Sky" during the Signify era on an ambient compilation; it later appeared on Stars Die: The Delerium Years 1991–1997. The guitar progression of "Spiral Circus" would be reused by Wilson project No-Man for "Something Falls," a b-side for their 2001 album Returning Jesus.

Release
The album was first released in February 1995 in Europe. The album would later release in North America in October 1995, the first album of the band's to do so. The track list would be changed for the album's American release. Besides the addition of "Stars Die", the different running order and the removal of "Prepare Yourself", the version of "Moonloop" on this edition is less than half the length of the one on the UK release. Additionally, the two parts of the title track on this version have been split into a number of sections.

The album was remastered and re-released as a two disc collection in 2004, including expanded and demo material. The song "The Sky Moves Sideways (Alternate Version)" represents outtakes and a work-in-progress mix of the original vision of the album as a single 34-minute track. The version of "Moonloop" here has three minutes of additional material previously available only on an EP, and is split into two tracks. This is the only version of The Sky Moves Sideways which includes both "Prepare Yourself" and "Stars Die". A triple vinyl edition was also released in the same year, by Headspin Music record label, including a 7-inch single with two versions of the song "Men of Wood", the first was taken from The Sky Moves Sideways recording sessions and the 2000 mix was previously included in the Stars Die: The Delerium Years 1991-1997 compilation.

A double vinyl edition was released in 2012 by Kscope. This vinyl edition features a new "anti-loudness" remaster which is closer to the natural dynamics of the original masters. The track list was the same as the first two LPs of the prior vinyl release, except for a 22-minute version of "Moonloop" on side four.

Reception

The album was generally well received. AllMusic praised it for "...continuing the excellence of Up the Downstair while achieving a new liquid sense of drama and overall flow.", specifically praising the track "Stars Die".

Track listing
Original European vinyl and CD release

Alternate Versions

2004 Expanded remaster

Personnel

Porcupine Tree
Steven Wilson – vocals, guitar; keyboards, tapes, programming and mix engineer
Colin Edwin – bass
Richard Barbieri – keyboards; electronics, programming
Chris Maitland – drums
Gavin Harrison – drums on "Dislocated Day" and "Moon Touches Your Shoulder" (2004 expanded remaster only)

Production
Markcus Butler – additional recording
Michael Bennion – art direction

Additional musicians
Ricky Edwards – additional percussion
Theo Travis – flute on "The Sky Moves Sideways Phase 1"
Suzanne J. Barbieri – vocals on "The Sky Moves Sideways Phase 2"

References

External links
Porcupine Tree Official Website
The Sky Moves Sideways at Snapper Music

Porcupine Tree albums
1995 albums